Au Gres Township is a civil township of Arenac County in the U.S. state of Michigan. As of the 2010 census, the township population was 953.  The city of Au Gres borders the township to the east but both are administered autonomously.

Geography

Demographics
As of the census of 2000, there were 1,007 people, 434 households, and 311 families residing in the township. There were 636 housing units at an average density of 18.8 per square mile (7.2/km2). The racial makeup of the township was 97.52% White, 0.10% African American, 0.89% Native American, 0.30% Asian, 0.10% Pacific Islander, and 1.09% from two or more races. Hispanic or Latino of any race were 0.10% of the population.

There were 434 households, out of which 24.4% had children under the age of 18 living with them, 63.1% were married couples living together, 4.8% had a female householder with no husband present, and 28.3% were non-families. 24.0% of all households were made up of individuals, and 11.3% had someone living alone who was 65 years of age or older.  The average household size was 2.32 and the average family size was 2.70.

In the township the population was spread out, with 20.6% under the age of 18, 5.6% from 18 to 24, 22.1% from 25 to 44, 33.3% from 45 to 64, and 18.5% who were 65 years of age or older.  The median age was 46 years. For every 100 females, there were 110.7 males.  For every 100 females age 18 and over, there were 105.1 males.

The median income for a household in the township was $34,141, and the median income for a family was $39,167. Males had a median income of $34,231 versus $21,136 for females. The per capita income for the township was $18,049.  About 7.4% of families and 9.4% of the population were below the poverty line, including 20.3% of those under age 18 and 3.7% of those age 65 or over.

References

Townships in Arenac County, Michigan
Townships in Michigan
Populated places on Lake Huron in the United States